The Whitney Museum of American Art, known informally as "The Whitney", is an art museum in the Meatpacking District and West Village neighborhoods of Manhattan in New York City. It was founded in 1930 by Gertrude Vanderbilt Whitney (1875–1942), a wealthy and prominent American socialite, sculptor, and art patron after whom it is named.

The Whitney focuses on 20th- and 21st-century American art. Its permanent collection, spanning the late-19th century to the present, comprises more than 25,000 paintings, sculptures, drawings, prints, photographs, films, videos, and artifacts of new media by more than 3,500 artists. It places particular emphasis on exhibiting the work of living artists as well as maintaining an extensive permanent collection of important pieces from the first half of the last century. The museum's Annual and Biennial exhibitions have long been a venue for younger and lesser-known artists whose work is showcased there.

From 1966 to 2014, the Whitney was at 945 Madison Avenue on Manhattan's Upper East Side in a building designed by Marcel Breuer and Hamilton P. Smith. The museum closed in October 2014 to relocate to its current building, which was designed by Renzo Piano at 99 Gansevoort Street and opened on May 1, 2015.

History

Early years

Gertrude Vanderbilt Whitney, the museum's namesake and founder, was a well-regarded sculptor and serious art collector. As a patron of the arts, she began acquiring art in 1905, and had already achieved some success with the Whitney Studio and Whitney Studio Club, New York–based exhibition spaces she operated from 1914 to 1928 to promote the works of avant garde and unrecognized American artists. Whitney favored the radical art of the American artists of the Ashcan School such as John French Sloan, George Luks, and Everett Shinn, as well as others such as Edward Hopper, Stuart Davis, Charles Demuth, Charles Sheeler, and Max Weber.

With the aid of her assistant, Juliana R. Force, Whitney collected nearly 700 works of American art. In 1929, she offered to donate over 500 to the Metropolitan Museum of Art, but the museum declined the gift. This, along with the apparent preference for European modernism at the recently opened Museum of Modern Art, led Whitney to start her own museum, exclusively for American art, in 1929.

Whitney Library archives from 1928 reveal that during this time, the Studio Club used the gallery space of Wilhelmina Weber Furlong of the Art Students League to exhibit traveling shows featuring modernist work. The Whitney Museum of American Art was founded in 1930; at this time architect Noel L. Miller was converting three row houses on West 8th Street in Greenwich Village—one of which, 8 West 8th Street had been the location of the Studio Club—to be the museum's home, as well as a residence for Whitney. The new museum opened in 1931. Force became the museum's first director, and under her guidance, it concentrated on displaying the works of new and contemporary American artists.

In 1954, the museum left its original location and moved to a small structure on 54th Street connected to and behind the Museum of Modern Art on 53rd Street. On April 15, 1958, a fire on MOMA's second floor that killed one person forced the evacuation of paintings and staff on MOMA's upper floors to the Whitney. Among the paintings evacuated was A Sunday Afternoon on the Island of La Grande Jatte, which was on loan from the Art Institute of Chicago.

Move to the Upper East Side

In 1961, the Whitney began seeking a site for a larger building. In 1966, it settled at the southeast corner of Madison Avenue and 75th Street on Manhattan's Upper East Side. The building, planned and built 1963–1966 by Marcel Breuer and Hamilton P. Smith in a distinctively modern style, is easily distinguished from the neighboring townhouses by its staircase façade made of granite stones and its trapezoidal windows. In 1967, Mauricio Lasansky showed "The Nazi Drawings". The exhibition traveled to the Whitney Museum of American Art in New York, where it appeared with shows by Louise Nevelson and Andrew Wyeth as the first exhibits in the new museum.

The institution grappled with space problems for decades. In 1967, the museum opened a satellite space called the Art Resources Center (ARC). Originally intended to be located in the South Bronx, the ARC opened on Cherry Street on the Lower East Side. From 1973 to 1983, the Whitney operated a branch at 55 Water Street, a building owned by Harold Uris, who gave the museum a lease for $1 a year. In 1983, Philip Morris International installed a Whitney branch in the lobby of its Park Avenue headquarters. In 1981, the museum opened an exhibition space in Stamford, Connecticut, housed at Champion International. In the late 1980s, the Whitney entered into arrangements with Park Tower Realty, IBM, and the Equitable Life Assurance Society of the United States, setting up satellite museums with rotating exhibitions in their buildings' lobbies. Each museum had its own director, with all plans approved by a Whitney committee.

The institution attempted to expand its landmark building in 1978, commissioning UK architects Derek Walker and Norman Foster to design a tall tower alongside it, the first of several proposals from leading architects, but each time, the effort was abandoned, because of the cost, the design, or both. To secure additional space for the museum's collections, then-director Thomas N. Armstrong III developed plans for a 10-story, $37.5 million addition to the main building. The proposed addition, designed by Michael Graves and announced in 1985, drew immediate opposition. Graves had proposed demolishing the flanking brownstones down to the East 74th Street corner for a complementary addition. The project gradually lost the support of the museum's trustees, and the plans were dropped in 1989. Between 1995 and 1998, the building underwent a renovation and expansion by Richard Gluckman. In 2001, Rem Koolhaas was commissioned to submit two designs for a $200 million expansion. Those plans were dropped in 2003, causing director Maxwell L. Anderson to resign. New York restaurateur Danny Meyer opened Untitled, a restaurant in the museum, in March 2011. The space was designed by the Rockwell Group.

Move downtown

The Whitney developed a new main building, designed by Renzo Piano, in the West Village and Meatpacking District in lower Manhattan. The new museum, at the intersection of Gansevoort and Washington Streets, was built on a previously city-owned site and marks the southern entrance to the High Line park. Construction began in 2010 and was completed in 2015. It cost $422 million. Robert Silman Associates was the structural engineer; Jaros, Baum & Bolles provided MEP services; Ove Arup & Partners was the lighting/daylighting engineer; and Turner Construction LLC served as construction manager.

The new structure spans  and eight stories that include the city's largest column-free art gallery spaces, an education center, theater, a conservation laboratory, and a library and reading rooms. Two of the floors are fully devoted to the museum's permanent collection. The only permanent artwork commissioned for the site—its four main elevators—were conceived by Richard Artschwager. The new building's collection comprises over 600 works by over 400 artists. Observation decks on the floors five through eight are linked by an outdoor staircase.

The new building is much more expansive and open than the old ones. As one New York Times review described the building:

The museum needed to raise $760 million for the building and its endowment. In May 2011, the Metropolitan Museum of Art announced it had entered into an agreement to occupy the Madison Avenue building for at least eight years starting in 2015, easing the Whitney's burden of having to finance two large museum spaces. The occupation of the old space was later postponed to 2016.

After an April 30, 2015, ceremonial ribbon-cutting attended by Michelle Obama and Bill de Blasio, the new building opened on May 1, 2015.

Collection

The museum displays paintings, drawings, prints, sculptures, installation art, video, and photography.

The original 600 works in the permanent collection grew to about 1,300 with the opening of the second building in 1954. This number grew to around 2,000 following its move to the Breuer building on Madison Avenue in 1966. It began collecting photography in 1991. Today, spanning the late 19th century to the present, the collection contains more than 25,000 artworks by upwards of 3,500 artists. Artists represented include Josef Albers, Joe Andoe, Edmund Archer, Donald Baechler, Thomas Hart Benton, Lucile Blanch, Jonathan Borofsky, Louise Bourgeois, Sonia Gordon Brown, Charles Burchfield, Alexander Calder, Suzanne Caporael, Norman Carton, Carolina Caycedo, Ching Ho Cheng, Talia Chetrit, Ann Craven, Anna Craycroft, Dan Christensen, Greg Colson, Susan Crocker, Ronald Davis, Stuart Davis, Mira Dancy, Lindsey Decker, Martha Diamond, Richard Diebenkorn, Daniella Dooling, Arthur Dove, Loretta Dunkelman, William Eggleston, Helen Frankenthaler, Georgia O'Keeffe, Arshile Gorky, Keith Haring, Grace Hartigan, Marsden Hartley, Robert Henri, Carmen Herrera, Eva Hesse, Hans Hofmann, Edward Hopper, Richard Hunt, Jasper Johns, Corita Kent, Franz Kline, Terence Koh, Willem de Kooning, Lee Krasner, Ronnie Landfield, John Marin, Knox Martin, John McCracken, John McLaughlin, Robert Motherwell, Bruce Nauman, Louise Nevelson, Barnett Newman, Kenneth Noland, Paul Pfeiffer, Jackson Pollock, Larry Poons, Maurice Prendergast, Kenneth Price, Robert Rauschenberg, Man Ray, Mark Rothko, Morgan Russell, Albert Pinkham Ryder, Cindy Sherman, John Sloan, Frank Stella, Andy Warhol, and hundreds of others.

Every two years, the museum hosts the Whitney Biennial, an international art show which displays many lesser-known artists new to the American art scene. It has displayed works by many notable artists, and has featured unconventional works, such as a 1976 exhibit of live body builders, featuring Arnold Schwarzenegger.

In addition to its traditional collection, the Whitney has a website, Artport, that features "Net Art" that changes regularly. The Whitney will not sell any work by a living artist because it could damage that artist's career, but it will trade a living artist's work for another piece by the same artist.

Gallery

Library
The Frances Mulhall Achilles Library is a research library originally built on the collections of books and papers of founder Gertrude Vanderbilt Whitney, and the Whitney Museum's first director, Juliana Force. The library operates in the West Chelsea area of New York City. It contains Special Collections and the Whitney Museum Archives. The archives contain the Institutional Archives, Research Collections, and Manuscript Collections. The Special Collections consist of artists' books, portfolios, photographs, titles in the Whitney Fellows Artist and Writers Series (1982–2001), posters, and valuable ephemera that relate to the permanent collection. The Institutional Archives include exhibition records, photographs, curatorial research notes, artist's correspondence, audio and video recordings, and trustees' papers from 1912 to the present.

Highlights:
 Arshile Gorky research collection, 1920s–1990s
 Edward Hopper research collection, 1894–2000

Books and materials in the library can be accessed in the museum's database.

Independent Study Program
The Whitney Independent Study Program (ISP) was founded in 1968 by Ron Clark. The Whitney ISP has helped start the careers of artists, critics, and curators including Jenny Holzer, Andrea Fraser, Julian Schnabel, Kathryn Bigelow, Roberta Smith, and Félix González-Torres, as well as many other well-known cultural producers. The program includes both art history and studio programs. Each year, the ISP selects 14 students for the Studio Program (artists), four for the Curatorial Program (curators) and six for the Critical Studies Program (researchers). It is a one-year program that includes both visiting and hired artists, art historians, and critics, and involves the reading of theory. Clark remains its director.

Notable alumni

 Jennifer Allora – 1998–1999
 Richard Armstrong - 1974
 Ashley Bickerton – 1982
 Kathryn Bigelow – 1971
 Kavin Buck – 1989-1990
 Moyra Davey – 1989
 Mark Dion – 1985
 Andrea Fraser – 1986
 LaToya Ruby Frazier – 2010–2011
 Andrea Geyer – 1999–2000
 Ken Gonzales-Day – 1992
 Félix González-Torres – 1980, 1983
 Renée Green – 1989
 Sharon Hayes – 1999–2000
 Heather Hart –  2008
 Jenny Holzer – 1976
 Ashley Hunt – 1999–2000
 Ryan Humphrey – 2005–2006
 Mary Kelly – 1987
 Glenn Ligon – 1985
 Richard Marshall - 1974
 John Miller – 1977
 Meleko Mokgosi – 2007–2008
 Sarah Morris – 1989–1990
 Paul Pfeiffer – 1997–1998
 Sarah Pirozek – 1987–1988
 Bettina Pousttchi – 1999–2000
 Carissa Rodriguez –  2001
 Emily Roysdon – 2000–2001
 Jayce Salloum — 1988
 Julian Schnabel – 1973
 Katharina Sieverding – 1976
 Roberta Smith – 1969
 Emily Sundblad – 2005–2006
 Rirkrit Tiravanija – 1986
 Oscar Tuazon – 2001–2003
 Julia Wachtel — 1979
 Roger Welch – 1970–1971
 Cameron Martin – 1996

Governance

Funding
As of March 2011, the Whitney's endowment was $207 million; the museum expected to raise $625 million from its capital campaign by 2015. As of June 2016, the endowment had grown to $308 million.

Historically, the operating performance has been essentially breakeven. The museum restricts the use of its endowment fund for yearly operating expenses to 5% of the fund's value. The Whitney has historically depended on private collectors and donors for acquisitions of new art. In 2008, Leonard A. Lauder gave the museum $131 million, the biggest donation in the Whitney's history. Donations for new purchases dropped to $1.3 million in 2010 from $2.7 million in 2006.

Directors
The museum's director is Adam D. Weinberg (since 2003). Former directors include Maxwell L. Anderson (1998–2003), David A. Ross (1991–1997), Thomas Armstrong III (1974–1990), and Juliana Rieser Force (1931–1948).

Board of Trustees
For years, Gertrude Vanderbilt Whitney supported the museum single-handedly, as did her daughter, Flora Whitney Miller, after her, and until 1961, its board was largely family-run. Flora Payne Whitney served as a museum trustee, then as vice president. From 1942 to 1974, she was the museum's president and chair, after which she served as honorary chair until her death in 1986. Her daughter Flora Miller Biddle served as president until 1995. Her book The Whitney Women and the Museum They Made was published in 1999.

In 1961, the need for outside support finally forced the board to add outside trustees, including bankers Roy Neuberger and Arthur Altschul. David Solinger became the Whitney's first outside president in 1966.
 Leonard A. Lauder, Chairman Emeritus of the Board of Trustees
 Flora Miller Biddle, Honorary Chairman of the Board of Trustees
 Robert J. Hurst, Co-Chair of the Board of Trustees
 Brooke Garber Neidich, Co-Chair of the Board of Trustees
 Neil Bluhm, President of the Board of Trustees
 Adam D. Weinberg, Alice Pratt Brown Director of the Whitney
 John Stanley, Chief Operating Officer

Criticism 

The Board of Trustees has come under criticism since November 2018 by groups including Decolonize This Place, the Chinatown Art Brigade, and W.A.G.E., for vice chair Warren B. Kanders' ownership of the company Safariland, which manufactured tear gas used against the late-2018 migrant caravans; 120 scholars and critics published an open letter to the Whitney Museum asking for the removal of Kanders from the museum board; additional signatories after the letter's initial posting included almost 50 artists who have been selected for the 2019 Whitney Biennial. A series of nine weeks of protest by Decolonize This Place highlighted the use of Safariland weapons against protestors and others in Palestine and other places.

On July 17, 2019, calls for Kanders's resignation were renewed following Artforum's publication of an essay, "The Tear Gas Biennial", by Hannah Black, Ciarán Finlayson, and Tobi Haslett. On July 19, four artists (Korakrit Arunanondchai, Meriem Bennani, Nicole Eisenman, and Nicholas Galanin) published a letter, also in Artforum, asking their work to be withdrawn from the exhibition. (The first artist to withdraw was Michael Rakowitz, who withdrew his work before the Biennial opened.) A day later, a second wave of artists (Eddie Arroyo, Christine Sun Kim, Agustina Woodgate, and Forensic Architecture) also withdrew.

On July 25, 2019, Warren B. Kanders announced his resignation from the Board of Trustees of the Whitney Museum. Kanders cited no wish to play a role in the museum's demise and urged fellow trustees to step up and assume leadership of the Whitney.

See also
 Whitney Museum of American Art (original building)
 List of museums and cultural institutions in New York City
 List of Whitney Biennial artists
 Whitney Biennial
 The Catalog Committee

References 
 Citations

External links
 
 Whitney Museum Library
 Artport: The Whitney Museum Portal to Net Art
 Conservation Lab Interiors
Whitney Museum within Google Arts & Culture

 
Art museums established in 1931
Buildings and structures completed in 1966
 
Museums of American art
Art museums and galleries in New York City
Museums in Manhattan
Modern art museums in the United States
Meatpacking District, Manhattan
1931 establishments in New York City
Art museums established in 2015
Renzo Piano buildings
Modernist architecture in New York City
Contemporary art galleries in the United States